In mathematics, Waldspurger's theorem, introduced by , is a result that identifies Fourier coefficients of modular forms of half-integral weight k+1/2 with the value of an L-series at s=k/2.

References

Modular forms
Zeta and L-functions
Theorems in number theory